The Evacuation of Fredericia was an event during the Second Schleswig War which began when Prussian and Austrian artillery shelled the fortress on March 20, 1864, with their artillery. When the Danish evacuated from the fortress which marked the end of Danish control of Jutland.

Background
After the Battle of Vejle on March 8, 1864, the Austrian corps, led by Ludwig von Gablenz, began on March 19 with the 1st Division with the Brigades of Johann Karl von Nostiz and Leopold Gondrecourt and the 2nd Division with the Brigades of Tomas and Dormus, under the leadership by Erwin von Neipperg in front of the fortress with the construction of the batteries. Although they did not have a siege park, the use of an 8-pound battery was considered quite effective. The Austrian 8-pounders were stationed at Erritsø and Jugelsang, the Prussian 6-pounders at Jgum and the 12-pounders at Christineborg within about half a mile. A unorganized Danish sortie was defeated with little to no problems. On March 20, the cannonade from 42 guns began to shell the fortress. The distance had been chosen so that the fort's old-fashioned guns, which could not carry that far, could hardly return fire. The barracks of the fortress soon fell victim to the flames and the buildings that were mostly made out of wood were not particularly valuable, but tons of material were lost in the process. In the following day, the bombardment was halted and Wrangel sent for inquiries as to whether Major-General Lunding was ready to surrender the fort. Hardly anyone was surprised when the answer came:

Wrangel had the army regrouped again however, there was no further shelling because they were convinced that siege equipment was needed for the siege, and therefore they wanted to wait for the end of the Siege of Düppler Schanzen in order to then use the leftover material here. The Danish armed forces did not remain idle during this period however and managed to ambush Austrian Guard Hussars in the village of Assendrup on March 29.

The Evacuation

On April 18 the Düppeler Schanzen fell and from there, Prussian regiments flooded back to Jutland in order to storm the last bastion at Fredericia. The entire siege artillery was slowly getting into position. But the attack never came. During the night of April 27–28, the fortress was abandoned by its defenders. The commander, Major General Christian Lunding, had managed to hide his withdrawal. So he continued to carry out visible entrenchment work. On the morning of April 28, only Lieutenant-Colonel Nielsen was still in the fortress with a hundred troops. The last crew did not leave for Funen until the night of April 28–29. But on April 28, the Austrians were notified by two deserters and they delivered the news of the withdrawal. At first it was believed to be a staged act, but when more and more citizens of the city confirmed the statement, the move into the deserted fortress began on April 29.

First the Lichtenstein hussars, then the Hessian infantry, then the King of the Belgians regiment and then Prussian engineers and Guard artillery. Only the poor lived in the houses in front of the fortress as the city lay in rubble and ruins. 206 nailed-up guns were found in the citadel with 84-pounders, 48-pounders, bomb and stone mortars, etc. The fortress facing the Little Belt was immediately rebuilt by the conquerors. However, it can also be assumed that the abandonment of the fortress has something to do with the hope of diplomatic efforts as on April 25, the London Conference of 1864 began. On May 3, the Fredericia fortress began to be razed and the magazines blown up. However contrary to popular belief, there was no iconoclasm as the statue Der tapfere Landsoldat by the sculptor Herman Wilhelm Bissen remained untouched to this today.

References

Bibliography
 Frank Jung: 1864. Der Krieg um Schleswig-Holstein. Ellert & Richter Verlag für Schleswig-Holsteinischer Zeitungsverlag, Hamburg 2014 .
 Oliver Bruhns: Schleswiger Stadtgeschichten. In: Reimer Witt, Oliver Bruhns: 1200 Jahre Schleswig. hrsg. vom Lions-Club Schleswig, 2006.
 Theodor Fontane: Der Schleswig-Holsteinsche Krieg im Jahre 1864, Berlin 1866

Battles involving Denmark
Battles involving Prussia
Battles involving Austria
Battles of the Second Schleswig War
Conflicts in 1864
1864 in Denmark
March 1864 events
April 1864 events